Calathus angularis is a species of ground beetle from the Platyninae subfamily that is endemic to the Canary Islands.

References

angularis
Beetles described in 1839
Endemic beetles of the Canary Islands
Taxa named by Gaspard Auguste Brullé